The Thomas Bjørn Open was a golf tournament on the Challenge Tour in 2005 and 2006. It was sponsored by Denmark's leading European Tour player, and former Challenge Tour Rankings winner, Thomas Bjørn.

Winners

Notes

References

External links
Coverage on the Challenge Tour's official site

Former Challenge Tour events
Golf tournaments in Denmark